Paralopostega callosa is a moth of the family Opostegidae. It was first described by Otto Swezey in 1921. It is endemic to the Hawaiian island of Oahu, where it is thought to be widespread in the Koʻolau Range.

The larvae feed on Melicope species, including Melicope lydgatei and Melicope rotundifolia. They mine the leaves of their host plant. The mine consists of a circular callous-like structure about half an inch in diameter on the upper surface of the leaf. At first, the young larvae creates a very slender mine, later the larva wanders for a time, finally coming to a perfect circle, and then continuing in a close spiral inside of this until the center is reached. A proliferation of tissue is produced and the upper epidermis is thickened up, the larva feeds beneath it until it is fully grown. Pupation takes place outside of the mine in a cocoon which is probably made amongst moss or debris on the ground, and is lenticular in shape. It is made of a pale reddish-brown silk.

External links
Generic Revision of the Opostegidae, with a Synoptic Catalog of the World's Species (Lepidoptera: Nepticuloidea)

Opostegidae
Endemic moths of Hawaii
Moths described in 1921